Ruben Dawnson (born 8 January 1999) is a Norwegian singer-songwriter, producer, and musician from Moss, Norway. His music deals with a variety of themes including climate change, love, anxiety, and mental health, and has been featured in the HBO TV-series Genera+ion. He has released with Bergen-based Norwegian record label GEMS, since 2021.

References

1999 births
Living people
People from Moss, Norway
Indie pop musicians
21st-century Norwegian male singers
21st-century Norwegian singers